Droopnath Ramphul State College (DRSC) is a state secondary school based in Calebasses, Mauritius. Students are prepared for the School Certificate and the Higher School Certificate. The school derives its name from an eminent judge Droopnath Ramphul.

Droopnath Ramphul State college is one of the leading national colleges for girls in Mauritius. This college is known for promoting its students in academics as well as other extra-curricular activities over the years.It is now a unisex college with the changes in the academic rules and regulations.

History 
This state college was built in 1975 and was named in 1980 in honour of late Judge Droopnath Ramphul. Born on the 20 February 1921, Justice Droopnath Ramphul is best remembered and honoured for his indelible, highly esteemed contribution in the field of Education.

Present (2022) 
The current rector of the college is Mrs. Sookharee.

See also
 Education in Mauritius
 List of secondary schools in Mauritius

References 

Secondary schools in Mauritius
Educational institutions established in 1975
1975 establishments in Mauritius
Girls' schools in Mauritius
Pamplemousses District